Sandbakelse, sandbakkels (meaning sand pastry), or sandkaker are a type of a sugar cookie commonly served during Christmas in Norway. They are also popular in Finland where they are known as hiekkahentuset.

Sandbakelse are made of flour, ground almond, butter, eggs, sugar, and almond extract—possibly with vanilla or rarely  cardamom. 
After the dough is mixed and cooled, it is pressed into fluted tins. Children as young as two or three can help with this phase, so it is a first baking experience for many. After ten minutes in the oven, popping the cookies out of the hot tins is best left to adults.

In 1845 a recipe for sandbakelse appeared in a Norwegian cookbook, but they were not widespread until later in the 19th century. They became popular later than the similar krumkake because sandbakelse required fine flour, which was not yet widely available. Emigrants took their tins and recipes west across the sea, where sandbakelse remain an "old-country" Christmas tradition for many Norwegian-Americans.

See also
 Cuisine of Norway
 Lefse
 List of Norwegian desserts
 Lutefisk
 Rosette (cookie)
 Smorgesbord

References

Christmas food
Cookies
Cuisine of Minnesota
Norwegian desserts
Finnish desserts